Sheepshead Bay Race Track was an American Thoroughbred horse racing facility built on the site of the Coney Island Jockey Club at Sheepshead Bay, New York.

Early history

The racetrack was built by a group of prominent businessmen from the New York City area who formed the Coney Island Jockey Club in 1879. Led by Leonard Jerome, James R. Keene,  and the track's president, William Kissam Vanderbilt, the Club held seasonal race cards at nearby Prospect Park fairgrounds until construction of the new race course was completed. On June 19, 1880 the track hosted its first day of Thoroughbred racing.

Old maps and railroad track diagrams for the Manhattan Beach Branch of the Long Island Rail Road showing the spur that served both the club and the racetrack indicates the entrance to the club was located on the east side of Ocean Avenue between Avenues X and Y. The Sheepshead Bay Race Track station contained six tracks and three island platforms.

In its first year of operations, the new Sheepshead Bay track hosted a 1½ mile match race between two of the top horses racing at the time in the United States. The Dwyer Brothers' Luke Blackburn was ridden by Jim McLaughlin, and Pierre Lorillard's Uncas was ridden by Tom Costello. Luke Blackburn won by twenty lengths.

Sheepshead Bay had both a dirt and a turf course.

Principal backers were:
August Belmont Jr.
Leonard Jerome
James G. K. Lawrence
Pierre Lorillard IV
A. Wright Sanford
William R. Travers
William Kissam Vanderbilt

The new Sheepshead Bay Race Track's premier event was the Suburban Handicap, first run on June 10, 1884 and conceived by James G. K. Lawrence, who became the track's president. Four years later Lawrence would also create the Futurity Stakes, first run on Labor Day in 1888. At the time, the Futurity was the richest race ever run in the United States. Today, both the Suburban and the Futurity are ongoing Graded stakes races held at the Belmont Park racetrack in Elmont on Long Island. The Lawrence Realization Stakes was named for James G. K. Lawrence.

First turf course in the United States

On June 10, 1886 the Coney Island Jockey Club opened the first turf racecourse in the United States. The Club replaced the Sheepshead Bay steeplechase course with a one-mile turf course, built inside the existing main dirt track. The Green Grass Stakes was the first race on turf and was run as part of the June 10 opening day program. A race for three-year-old horses, it was contested at a distance of a mile and an eighth and was won by Emory & Cotton's Dry Monopole in a time of 157.00.

Demise

In 1908, the administration of Governor Charles Evans Hughes signed into law the Hart–Agnew bill that effectively banned all racetrack betting in the state of New York. The legislation allowed for fines and up to a year in prison which was strictly enforced.

Compounding matters for the Sheepshead Bay track was intense competition. In a summary of 1909 racing, the Daily Racing Form reported that "Sheepshead Bay, which for years led the country in daily average distribution, yielded first place in 1909 to Belmont Park, which August Belmont and his associates are ambitious to make the "turf headquarters of America"."
 A 1910 amendment to the Hart–Agnew legislation added further restrictions that made the owners and directors of a racetrack personally liable for any betting done on their premises, with or without their consent. Such an onerous liability was intolerable and meant that by 1911 all racetracks in the state ceased operations. Although a February 21, 1913 ruling by the New York Supreme Court, Appellate Division paved the way for racing to resume that year, by then it was too late for horse racing at the Sheepshead Bay Race Track and it was ultimately sold to the Sheepshead Bay Speedway Corporation who used it for automobile racing.

In December 1919, what the Daily Racing Form called one of the most famous racetracks in the history of the American turf, was purchased for real estate development. The facility was torn down and the land subdivided into building lots.

Thoroughbred stakes races at Sheepshead Bay
Stakes race titles

Flat races

 Advance Stakes 
 Annual Champion Stakes
 Autumn Cup Handicap
 Autumn Stakes
 Autumn Maiden Stakes
 Bay Ridge Handicap
 Belles Stakes
 Century Handicap 
 Commonwealth Handicap
 Coney Island Derby
 Coney Island Handicap
 Daisy Stakes
 Dash Stakes
 Dolphin Stakes 
 Double Event Stakes (part 1)
 Double Event Stakes (part 2)
 Equality Stakes 
 Fall Handicap Ŧ
 Flatbush Stakes
 Flight Stakes
 Flying Handicap 
 Foam Stakes 
 Futurity Stakes
 Grass Selling Stakes
 Golden Rod Stakes
 Great Eastern Handicap
 Great Filly Stakes 
 Great Trial Stakes
 June Stakes
 Lawrence Realization Stakes
 Long Island Handicap
 Mermaid Stakes 
 Ocean Handicap Ŧ
 Omnium Handicap Ŧ
 Pansy Stakes
 Partridge Stakes 
 Reapers Stakes
 Rosebuds Stakes 
 Russet Stakes
 Sapphire Stakes
 September Stakes 
 Sheepshead Bay Handicap
 Sheepshead Bay Maiden Stakes 
 Spring Stakes
 Spindrift Stakes 
 Suburban Handicap
 Surf Stakes 
 Swift Stakes
 Thistle Stakes
 Tidal Stakes 
 Turf Handicap
 Twin City Handicap 
 Vernal Stakes
 Waldorf Stakes
 Zephyr Stakes 

Ŧ One of the three Sheepshead Bay Autumn Serials.

In 1959, the Sheepshead Bay Handicap was named in honor of the old racetrack, and first run at the now-defunct Jamaica Race Course in Jamaica, New York. It, too, is currently held at Belmont Park.

Steeplechase
 Beacon Steeplechase
 Independence Steeplechase
 Westbury Steeplechase

Sheepshead Bay Speedway Corporation

 

The new owner converted the horse track to a board automobile race track. Several auto races were held from October 1915, through September 1919, including the Astor Cup Race and the Harkness Trophy Race. The Sheepshead Bay Speedway Corporation ran into financial difficulties following the death of its majority shareholder Harry Harkness in January 1919.  The property was sold in 1923 for residential real estate development. No trace of the racetrack can be found today.

Other defunct New York race tracks
 Brighton Beach Race Course 
 Gravesend Race Track
 Jamaica Race Course
 Jerome Park Racetrack
 Morris Park Racecourse

References

External links
 Information and photos of Sheepshead Bay Race Track

 
1880 establishments in New York (state)
Coney Island
Defunct horse racing venues in New York City
Sports venues in Brooklyn
Harkness family
Motorsport venues in New York (state)
Defunct motorsport venues in the United States
1919 disestablishments in New York (state)
Sports venues completed in 1880